Cicadettana kansa is a species of cicada in the family Cicadidae, found in North America. The species was formerly a member of the genus Cicadetta.

References

Further reading

 

Articles created by Qbugbot
Insects described in 1919
Cicadettini